The 2015 Montgomery mayoral election took place on August 25, 2015, to elect the Mayor of Montgomery, Alabama.

The election was officially nonpartisan, with all candidates that ran together, regardless of party. Had no candidate received a majority of the vote, a runoff election would have been held between the top two candidates.

Incumbent Republican Mayor Todd Strange won re-election to a second full term in office without a runoff on August 25, 2015.

Candidates

Republican Party

Declared
 Artur Davis, former Democratic U.S. Representative and Democratic candidate for Governor of Alabama in 2010
 Todd Strange, incumbent mayor

Democratic Party

Declared
 Ella Bell, Alabama State Board of Education member
 Dan Harris, Montgomery County Commissioner

Declined to run
 Joe Hubbard, former state representative and nominee for attorney general in 2014
 Steven Reed, Montgomery County Probate Judge
 Quinton Ross, state senator

Results

References

External links
Official campaign websites
 Artur Davis for Mayor
 Dan Harris for Mayor
 Todd Strange for Mayor

Mayoral elections in Montgomery, Alabama
2015 Alabama elections
Montgomery